CVM may refer to:

Veterinary medicine
 California Variegated Mutant, a sheep breed
 Center for Veterinary Medicine of U.S. FDA
 Cervical Vertebral Malformation or wobbler disease of dogs and horses
 Complex vertebral malformation of Holstein cattle

Other uses
 Christian Vision for Men, a UK charity
 Climate Vulnerability Monitor
 Securities Commission (Brazil)
 Cooperation and Verification Mechanism of EU applicant state
 General Pedro J. Méndez International Airport in Ciudad Victoria, Mexico, IATA code